Malekabad (also Romanized as Malekābād and Malakābād) is a village in Marhemetabad-e Jonubi Rural District, in the Central District of Miandoab County, West Azerbaijan Province, Iran. At the 2006 census, its population was 910, in 213 families.

References 

Populated places in Miandoab County